Thomas Banks (born 17 August 1858 – death unknown) was an English rugby union footballer who played in the 1880s and 1890s. He played at representative level for British Isles, and Lancashire, and at club level for Swinton, as a half-back, three-quarters, or forward. Prior to Tuesday 2 June 1896, Swinton were a rugby union club.

Background
Banks' birth was registered in Salford, Lancashire, England.

Playing career

International honours
Banks won cap(s) for British Isles while at Swinton on the 1888 British Lions tour to New Zealand and Australia, against Otago on Saturday 28 April 1888, against Otago (1-try) on Wednesday 2 May 1888, against Canterbury on Wednesday 9 May 1888, against Wellington on Saturday 12 May 1888, against Queensland on Saturday 25 August 1888, against Newcastle (1-try) on Wednesday 29 August 1888, against Auckland on 8 September 1888, and against Auckland on Wednesday 12 September 1888.

Change of code
When Swinton converted from the rugby union code to the rugby league code on Tuesday 2 June 1896, Banks would have been approximately 37 years old. Consequently, he was not both a rugby union and rugby league footballer for Swinton.

Outside of rugby
Banks studied at the University of Edinburgh Medical School; while there, he won the long-distance swimming championship.

References

External links
Search for "Banks" at espn.co.uk (1888 British Isles tourists statistics missing (31 December 2017))
Football – British Football Team’s Visit To New Zealand.
The Return Of The English Team To Their Native Land
Photograph 'Swinton 1882–83' at swintonlionstales.co.uk
Photograph 'Swinton 1886' at swintonlionstales.co.uk
Search for "Tomas Banks" at britishnewspaperarchive.co.uk
Search for "Tom Banks" at britishnewspaperarchive.co.uk

1858 births
Alumni of the University of Edinburgh
British & Irish Lions rugby union players from England
English rugby union players
Lancashire County RFU players
People from Pendlebury
Place of death missing
Rugby union forwards
Rugby union halfbacks
Rugby union players from Salford
Rugby union three-quarters
Swinton Lions players
Year of death unknown